The 2019 Baltic Endurance Championship was the fifth Baltic Endurance Championship season. It began at Biķernieki Complex Sports Base on 10 May and ended at Auto24ring on 21 September.

Calendar

Teams

Calendar and results

Scoring system

Championship standings

Overall

References

External links
Official Webpage
Facebook page

Baltic Endurance
Touring car racing series
Motorsport competitions in Estonia
Motorsport competitions in Latvia
Sports competitions in Lithuania